Scrobipalpa voltinella is a moth in the family Gelechiidae. It was described by Pierre Chrétien in 1898. It is found in Spain, southern France, Italy, Croatia, Serbia, Turkey and Ukraine.

Adults are uniform coffee brown with a lighter forewing margin.

The larvae feed on Rhaponticum coniferum and Tanacetum corymbosum. They mine the leaves of their host plant. The mine has the form of a large blotch in the basal leaves. The frass is concentrated in the oldest part of the mine. Pupation takes place outside of the mine.

References

Scrobipalpa
Moths described in 1898